Bolshaya Ordynka   is a historical street in Central Administrative Okrug of Moscow, Russia.

External links 

Streets in Moscow
Central Administrative Okrug